Robert G. Luna is an American law enforcement officer who is the Sheriff of Los Angeles County, previously serving as Chief of the Long Beach Police Department before defeating Sheriff Alex Villanueva in the 2022 election.

Early life 
Luna was born and raised in East Los Angeles to immigrant parents and has said that his early experiences with deputies patrolling his neighborhood shaped his view in law enforcement.  He attended and later graduated from Long Beach City College, where he met Long Beach Police Sergeant Mike Woodward and decided to pursue becoming a law enforcement officer.

Career

Long Beach Police Department 
In 1985, he joined the Long Beach Police Department and served as a patrol officer and on the SWAT team and was named as the Deputy Chief in 2006. In 2014, Luna was appointed as the 26th Chief of the Long Beach Police Department, succeeding Jim McDonnell who had become the Sheriff of Los Angeles County. In September 2021, Luna announced that he would retire in December of that year.

Los Angeles County Sheriff 
In December 2021, Luna entered the race for the 2022 Los Angeles County Sheriff election, challenging incumbent Alex Villanueva alongside a crowded field of candidates. In the primary election, Luna scored second place in the election, putting him against Villanueva in the general election. In the general election, Luna beat Villanueva to become Sheriff, with Villanueva conceding on November 15, 2022. Luna was sworn in as Sheriff on December 5, 2022.

References 

Living people
Year of birth missing (living people)
Place of birth missing (living people)
Los Angeles County, California sheriffs
California Republicans
California Democrats
American municipal police chiefs
Long Beach City College alumni
People from East Los Angeles, California